Gervais Kago (born 19 December 1987 in Bangui, Central African Republic) is a footballer from the Central African Republic who currently plays for Bamboutos FC of the Elite One, the top division of Cameroonian football.

Simba SC

Alongside Felix Sunzu, Kago transferred to Tanzanian giants Simba SC in August 2011. However, the midfielder was not allowed to participate in club matches as FIFA approbated a peremptory rule that the Transfer Matching System must be used to record the transfer which did not happen beforehand. By late August, the Tanzania Football Federation secured his International Transfer Certificate through the Transfer Matching System, clearing him to play, serendipitiously in time for the Tanzania Community Shield which he participated in.

International

Missed the 2012 Africa Cup of Nations qualification group stage clash encountering Morocco after failure to get the plane ticket punctually.

References

Central African Republic footballers
Central African Republic international footballers
Association football midfielders
Central African Republic expatriate footballers
Living people
1987 births
Expatriate footballers in Equatorial Guinea
Simba S.C. players
Expatriate footballers in Cameroon
Expatriate footballers in Tanzania
Les Astres players
Central African Republic expatriate sportspeople in Equatorial Guinea
Central African Republic expatriate sportspeople in Cameroon
Central African Republic expatriate sportspeople in Tanzania
Tanzanian Premier League players